This article includes the 2015 ITF Men's Circuit tournaments which occurred between July and September 2015.

Points distribution

Key

Month

July

August

September

References

External links
 International Tennis Federation official website

2015 ITF Men's Circuit